Shumi Dechasa (born 28 May 1989) is an Ethiopian-born Bahraini long distance runner who specialises in the marathon. He competed in the marathon event at the 2015 World Championships in Athletics in Beijing, China, where he finished 5th.

In 2017 Shumi was 8th in the Stockholm Marathon in 2:15:35 and came 15th in 2:15:08 at the London 2017 World Championships in Athletics  men's marathon. The race was won by Kenya's Geoffrey Kirui. In 2019 Shumi was 2nd at the Geneva Marathon in 2:09:55, just ten seconds back from the race winner Bernard Too. Shumi won the 2021 Geneva Marathon, in a time of 2:06:59.

References

External links

1989 births
Living people
Bahraini male long-distance runners
Bahraini male marathon runners
World Athletics Championships athletes for Bahrain
Place of birth missing (living people)
Ethiopian emigrants to Bahrain
Naturalized citizens of Bahrain
Ethiopian male long-distance runners
Ethiopian male marathon runners
Athletes (track and field) at the 2020 Summer Olympics
Olympic athletes of Bahrain